Kingussie is a small town in the Badenoch and Strathspey ward of the Highland council area of Scotland. Historically in Inverness-shire, it lies beside the A9 road, although the old route of the A9 serves as the town's main street which has been bypassed since 1979.

History 

The name "Kingussie" comes from the Gaelic, "Ceann a' Ghiuthsaich" which means "Head of the Pine forest".

The ruins of the early 18th-century Ruthven Barracks (Historic Scotland; open to visitors at all times) lie near the original site of the village, which was moved to avoid the flood plain of the River Spey. The Hanoverian Barracks were built on the site of Ruthven Castle, the seat of the Comyns, Lords of Badenoch in the Middle Ages.

Shinty

According to the Guinness Book of Records 2005, Kingussie is the world sport's most successful sporting team of all time, winning 20 consecutive leagues and going 4 years unbeaten at one stage in the early 1990s.

Tourism 
The main railway line to Inverness passes through from Edinburgh, Glasgow and points south. Some years ago, the TV series Monarch of the Glen was filmed in and around the area of Kingussie.

The Highland Wildlife Park is close by. The Highland Folk Museum is in Newtonmore,  from Kingussie. Kingussie is at the centre of a network of well maintained and waymarked footpaths; one of the most popular walks in the area is the ascent to Creag Bheag, a prominent hill overlooking its centre.

Education 
There are two schools located in Kingussie. There is Kingussie Primary School, situated just off the High Street at the southern end of the village, which caters for children in Nursery and P1-P7 (around age 3 to age 12). After P7, most children will normally then transfer to the local Kingussie High School. The school building dates from 1876. The current school roll is 16 children in Nursery and 84 primary school pupils.

Kingussie High School is the secondary school in Kingussie. It serves pupils from S1-S7 (which is usually around age 11 or 12, depending on when the child was born, to age 18). There are six associated primary schools,  Aviemore, Alvie (Kincraig), Dalwhinnie, Gergask (Laggan), Kingussie and Newtonmore. Primary 7 pupils from these associated schools will automatically transfer to Kingussie High School after summer, unless the pupil moves to another catchment area, or gets a placement request accepted at another school. There are records to suggest that there has been a secondary school in Kingussie since the time of the Columban missionaries, but the current building dates from 1970. A new extension was built and originally was supposed to be finished in February 2013, and, after another delay in August, officially opened on September 20, 2013. The extension added 9 more classrooms, a new entrance, a new social area, more car parking space, as well as a new Pupil Support Unit, which caters for pupils with additional support needs or pupils who need more support with their learning or attendance in school. Before the new Pupil Support Unit extension was built, many pupils with complex needs had to go outside the Badenoch and Strathspey area for their education. The current school roll is estimated at over 400 pupils, although this figure is expected to rise to over 500 in the coming years. The school motto is "Du Dichiollach", which is Gaelic for "with diligence".

Speyside Way 
The Speyside Way is a long-distance route which currently has its southern terminus at Aviemore, north of Kingussie. There is, however, a proposed extension to the route to Newtonmore, going through Kingussie on the way. See the link below for more information:

Kingussie in film 
Kingussie featured in the 8-time Oscar-winning Danny Boyle film Slumdog Millionaire.

Kingussie in literature 
Kingussie is mentioned in Compton Mackenzie's book The Monarch of the Glen, on which the BBC TV series was based. In chapter 8 Kingussie Sanatorium, now St Vincent's Hospital, is mentioned. In Ali Smith's 2019 novel Spring, four protagonists meet at Kingussie station.

Activities 
 Walking
 Mountain biking
 Horse riding and pony trekking: The popular outdoor sport of pony trekking was credited with being started in Badenoch at nearby Newtonmore in 1952 by Ewan Ormiston, it is still possible to ride with his grandson Ruaridh at the Highland Horse Fun Riding Centre in Kingussie.
 Fishing
 Shooting
 Badminton

Football 
Although the village is more famous for its Shinty club, it also has a successful football side which plays its games in the local Strathspey & Badenoch Welfare FA.

References

External links

 
Populated places in Badenoch and Strathspey
Towns in Highland (council area)